The Northamptonshire flag is the official flag of the English county of Northamptonshire.  It was registered by the Flag Institute on 11 September 2014, the design being a gold cross fimbriated in black on a maroon background with a rose in the centre.



Flag design
The flag was designed by Brady Ells and Ian Chadwick and consists of a gold cross fimbriated in black on a maroon field and a rose in the centre. It was the winning design of a shortlist of four put forward for a public vote. The cross represents the county's location as a crossroads in England, the colours were inspired by the county's cricket team and county town's football team, and the black border represents the county's leather industry. A rose was selected for the centre as it has long been a symbol for the county. The rose design was created based on research into roses used in the past to represent the county, and a final design included elements of these historic depictions.

Use
The flag was unveiled at a special ceremony at the Northamptonshire County Hall by Northamptonshire County Council. It was raised above the building on 25 October 2014 to coincide with the newly created County Day, held on St Crispin's Day.

References

External links

[ Flag Institute – Northamptonshire]

Northamptonshire
Northamptonshire
Northamptonshire
Northamptonshire